The 7th BET Awards took place at the Shrine Auditorium in Los Angeles, California on June 26, 2007. The awards recognized Americans in music, acting, sports, and other fields of entertainment over the past year. Comedian Mo'Nique hosted the awards for the third time.

Nominees and winners

References

External links
 BET Awards website

BET Awards